This is a list of events in Scottish television from 1975.

Events
6 January – The first edition of the new Scottish politics programme Public Account is broadcast on BBC1 Scotland. It is shown late at night on Monday evenings.
9 August – Debut of BBC Scotland's sports strand Sportscene which replaced Sportsreel.
Unknown – Schools programmes in Gaelic are broadcast for the first time.

Debuts

BBC
August - Sportscene on BBC 1 and BBC 2 (1975–Present)

Television series
Scotsport (1957–2008)
Reporting Scotland (1968–1983; 1984–present)
Top Club (1971–1998)
Scotland Today (1972–2009)
Sutherland's Law (1973–1976)

Births
24 July – Laura Fraser, actress
7 August - Hans Matheson, actor
11 December - Dawn Steele, actress

See also
1975 in Scotland

References

 
Television in Scotland by year
1970s in Scottish television